Paris Charles de Gaulle Airport, also known as Roissy Airport or simply Paris CDG, is the principal airport serving the French capital, Paris (and its metropolitan area), and the largest international airport in France.

Charles de Gaulle Airport serves as the principal hub for Air France and a destination for other legacy carriers (from Star Alliance, Oneworld and SkyTeam), as well as a focus city for low-cost carriers easyJet and Vueling. It is operated by Groupe ADP under the brand Paris Aéroport.

In 2019, the airport handled 76,150,007 passengers and 498,175 aircraft movements, thus making it the world's ninth busiest airport and Europe's second busiest airport (after Heathrow) in terms of passenger numbers. Charles de Gaulle is also the busiest airport within the European Union. In terms of cargo traffic, the airport is the eleventh busiest in the world and the busiest in Europe, handling  of cargo in 2019. It is also the airport that is served by the greatest number of airlines, with more than 105 airlines operating at the airport.

, the airport offers direct flights to the most countries and hosts the most airlines in the world. Marc Houalla has been the director of the airport since 12 February 2018.

Location 
The airport area, including terminals and runways, spans over three départements and six communes:
 Seine-et-Marne département: Le Mesnil-Amelot (Terminal 2E, Satellites S3 and S4, and Terminal 2F), Mauregard (Terminals 1, 3), and Mitry-Mory (Terminal 2G) communes;
 Seine-Saint-Denis département: Tremblay-en-France (Terminals 2A, 2B, 2C, 2D and Roissypôle) commune;
 Val-d'Oise département: Roissy-en-France and Épiais-lès-Louvres communes.

The choice of constructing an international aviation hub outside of central Paris was made due to a limited prospect of potential relocations or expropriations and the possibility of further expanding the airport in the future.

Management of the airport lies solely on the authority of Groupe ADP, which also manages Orly (south of Paris), Le Bourget (to the immediate southwest of Charles de Gaulle Airport, now used for general aviation and Paris Air Shows), several smaller airfields in the suburbs of Paris, and other airports directly or indirectly worldwide.

History

Development 
The planning and construction phase of what was known then as Aéroport de Paris Nord (Paris North Airport) began in 1966. On 8 March 1974 the airport, renamed Charles de Gaulle Airport, opened. Terminal 1 was built in an avant-garde design of a ten-floors-high circular building surrounded by seven satellite buildings, each with six gates allowing sunlight to enter through apertures. The main architect was Paul Andreu, who was also in charge of the extensions during the following decades.

Following the introduction of the brand Paris Aéroport to all its Parisian airports, Groupe ADP also announced major changes for the Charles de Gaulle Airport: Terminals of the Satellite 1 will be merged, as well as terminals 2B and 2D. A new luggage automated sorting system and conveyor under Terminal 2E Hall L was installed to speed luggage delivery time for airlines operating Paris-Charles de Gaulle's hub. The CDG Express, the direct express rail link from Paris to Charles de Gaulle Airport, is scheduled to open in early 2027.

Corporate Identity 
The Frutiger typeface was commissioned for use in the airport and implemented on signs throughout the building in 1975. Initially called Roissy, it was renamed after its designer Adrian Frutiger.

Until 2005, every PA announcement made at Terminal 1 was preceded by a distinctive chime, nicknamed "Indicatif Roissy" and composed by Bernard Parmegiani in 1971. The chime can be heard in the Roman Polanski film Frantic. The chime was officially replaced by the "Indicatif ADP" chime.

On 14 April 2016, the Groupe ADP rolled out the Connect 2020 corporate strategy and the commercial brand Paris Aéroport was applied to all Parisian airports, including Le Bourget airport.

Terminals 

Charles de Gaulle Airport has three terminals: Terminal 1 is the oldest and situated opposite to Terminal 3. Terminal 1 is mainly used by Star Alliance and other airlines; Terminal 2 is located at another side with 7 sub-terminal buildings (2A to 2G). Terminal 2 was originally built exclusively for Air France; since then it has been expanded significantly and now houses SkyTeam, Oneworld and other airlines. Terminals 2A to 2F are interconnected by elevated walkways and situated next to each other. Terminal 2G is a satellite building connected by shuttle bus. Both Terminals 1 and 2 handle airlines from all three alliances. 

Terminal 3 (formerly known as "Terminal 9") hosts charter and low-cost airlines. The CDGVAL light-rail shuttle connects Terminal 2 to Terminals 1/3 and their parking lots.

Prior to the pandemic, Charles de Gaulle Airport had assigned all Star Alliance members to use Terminal 1, Oneworld members to use Terminal 2A and SkyTeam members to use Terminals 2C, 2E (intercontinental), 2D, 2F and 2G (European routes).

Currently, terminals 1, 2B, 2E, 2F, 2G and 3 are opened. As of 13 January 2023, all airlines have been relocated to their new terminal assignments.

Terminal 1 
The first terminal, designed by Paul Andreu, was built in the image of an octopus. It consists of a circular terminal building which houses key functions such as check-in counters and baggage claim conveyors. Seven satellites with boarding gates are connected to the central building by underground walkways.

The central building, with a large skylight in its centre, dedicates each floor to a single function. The first floor is reserved for technical operations and not accessible to the public. The second floor contains shops and restaurants, the CDGVAL inter-terminal shuttle train platforms (for Terminal 2 and trains to central Paris) and check-in counters from a recent renovation. The majority of check-in counters, however, are located on the third floor, which also has access to taxi stands, bus stops and special pick-up vehicles. Departing passengers with valid boarding passes can reach the fourth floor, which houses duty-free stores and border control posts, for the boarding gates. The fifth floor contains baggage claim conveyors for arriving passengers. All four upper floors have assigned areas for parking and airline offices.

Passages between the third, fourth and fifth floors are provided by a tangle of escalators arranged through the centre of the building. These escalators are suspended over the central court. Each escalator is covered with a transparent tube to shelter from all weather conditions. These escalators were often used in film shootings (e.g., The Last Gang of Ariel Zeitoun). The Alan Parsons Project album I Robot features these escalators on its cover.

Star Alliance airlines are mainly present at Terminal 1 except Air China (Terminal 2E), Croatia Airlines (Terminal 2B), Ethiopian Airlines, EVA Air and Thai Airways International (all Terminal 2E). Other airlines include Oneworld airlines Cathay Pacific, Qatar Airways, SriLankan Airlines and future member Oman Air, SkyTeam member Saudia, and other non-aligned airlines including Aer Lingus, Azores Airlines,  Bulgaria Air, Emirates, Etihad Airways, Eurowings, Icelandair, Kuwait Airways and Norwegian Air Shuttle. Cyprus Airways also began operations from the terminal when it reopened. Previously, Oneworld member Royal Air Maroc operated from this terminal, but shortly after it joined Oneworld in 2020, it transferred its flights to Terminal 2B.

Terminal 2 
Terminal 2 is spread across seven sub-terminals: 2A to 2G. Terminal 2G can only be accessed by shuttle bus from Terminals 1, 2A to 2F and 3. The CDGVAL inter-terminal shuttle train, Paris RER Regional-Express and high-speed TGV rail station, Aéroport Charles de Gaulle 2 TGV, is located within the Terminal 2 complex and between 2C and 2E (on one side) or 2D and 2F (on the opposite side).

Terminal 2F was used for the filming of the music video for the U2 song "Beautiful Day". The band also had their picture taken inside Terminal 2F for the album artwork of their 2000 album All That You Can't Leave Behind.

Air France and all other SkyTeam and Oneworld airlines are the main operators of Terminal 2 with the exception of SkyTeam member Saudia and Oneworld's Middle East and Asian members who operate from Terminal 1. However, Oneworld Asian member Japan Airlines operates at this terminal concourse E. Several other airlines also operate from this terminal including Star Alliance members Air China, Croatia Airlines, Ethiopian Airlines, EVA Air, and Thai Airways International, easyJet and most non-aligned airlines.

Collapse of Terminal 2E 

On 23 May 2004, shortly after the inauguration of terminal 2E, a portion of it collapsed near Gate E50, killing four people. Two of the dead were reported to be Chinese citizens, one Czech and the other Lebanese. Three other people were injured in the collapse. Terminal 2E had been inaugurated in 2003 after some delays in construction and was designed by Paul Andreu. Administrative and judicial enquiries were started. Andreu also designed Terminal 3 at Dubai International Airport, which collapsed while under construction on 28 September 2004.

Before this accident, ADP had been planning for an initial public offering in 2005 with the new terminal as a major attraction for investors. The partial collapse and indefinite closing of the terminal just before the beginning of summer seriously hurt the airport's business plan.

In February 2005, the results from the administrative inquiry were published. The experts pointed out that there was no single fault, but rather a number of causes for the collapse, in a design that had little margin for safety. The inquiry found the concrete vaulted roof was not resilient enough and had been pierced by metallic pillars and some openings weakened the structure. Sources close to the inquiry also disclosed that the whole building chain had worked as close to the limits as possible, so as to reduce costs. Paul Andreu denounced the building companies for having not correctly prepared the reinforced concrete.

On 17 March 2005, ADP decided to tear down and rebuild the whole part of Terminal 2E (the "jetty") of which a section had collapsed, at a cost of approximately €100 million. The reconstruction replaced the innovative concrete tube style of the jetty with a more traditional steel and glass structure. During reconstruction, two temporary departure lounges were constructed in the vicinity of the terminal that replicated the capacity of 2E before the collapse. The terminal reopened completely on 30 March 2008.

Terminal 2G 

Terminal 2G, dedicated to regional Air France and HOP! flights and its affiliates, opened in 2008. This terminal is to the east of all terminals and can only be reached by shuttle bus. Terminal 2G is used for passengers flying in the Schengen Area (and thus has no passport control) and handles Air France regional and European traffic and provides small-capacity planes (up to 150 passengers) with a faster turnaround time than is currently possible by enabling them to park close to the new terminal building and boarding passengers primarily by bus, or walking. A bus line called "navette orange" connects the terminal 2G inside the security check area with terminals 2E and 2F. Passengers transferring to other terminals need to continue their trip with other bus shuttles within the security check area if they do not need to get their bags.

Terminal 2E Hall L (Satellite 3) 
Check-in and baggage handling are provided by the existing infrastructure in Terminals 2E and 2F. Satellite 3 was opened in part on 27 June 2007 and fully operational in September 2007. It corresponds now to gates L of terminal 2E.

Terminal 2E Hall M (Satellite 4) 
The satellite S4, adjacent to the S3 and part of terminal 2E, officially opened on 28 June 2012. It corresponds now to gates M of terminal 2E. Dedicated to long-haul flights, it has the ability to handle 16 aircraft at the same time, with an expected capacity of 7.8 million passengers per year. Its opening has led to the relocation of all SkyTeam airlines to terminals 2E (for international carriers), 2F (for Schengen European carriers) and 2G.

Future 
Air France has moved all of its operations previously located at 2C to 2E. In October 2012, 2F closed its international operations and became completely Schengen, allowing for all Air France flights currently operating in 2D to relocate to terminal 2F.

Further, in April 2013, Terminal 2B closed for a complete renovation (all airlines relocated to 2D) and received upgrades including the addition of a second floor completely dedicated to arrivals. Terminal 2B reopened on 2 June 2021 for the use of the Lufthansa group (including Austrian Airlines, who previously used Terminal 2D before the pandemic), Aegean Airlines, easyJet, Icelandair, LOT Polish Airlines, Norwegian Air Shuttle, Play, Royal Air Maroc, and Scandinavian Airlines. Low-cost carrier EasyJet has shown its interest in being the sole carrier at 2B. To facilitate connections, a new boarding area between 2A and 2C was opened in March 2012. It allows for all security and passport control to be handled in a single area, allows for many new shopping opportunities as well as new airline lounges, and eases transfer restrictions between 2A and 2C.

Since the pandemic, 2D is closed and is receiving similar upgrades, including the addition of a new floor (all airlines relocated to 2B). However, the departures level is still opened for additional boarding gates at Terminal 2B.  Terminals 2A and 2C are closed for baggage renovation system for 18 months (all airlines relocated to Terminals 1 or 2B).

Cancelled project for Terminal 4 

According to La Tribune, a new Terminal 4 was to be built around 2025, when Charles de Gaulle Airport's maximum capacity of 80 million would have been reached. This new Terminal 4, when constructed, would have been able to accommodate 30–40 million passengers per year and would have likely been built north of Terminal 2E. The Terminal 4 proposal was cancelled in 2021, after reduced traffic from the COVID-19 pandemic and new environmental regulations made it unfeasible.

Terminal 3 
Terminal 3 is located 1 km (0.62 mi) away from Terminal 1. It consists of one single building for arrivals and departures. Terminal 3 has no boarding gates constructed and all passengers are ferried via boarding buses to the aircraft stands.

Terminal Assignments
As of 13 January 2023, Charles de Gaulle's three terminals are assigned as the following:

Terminal usage during COVID-19 pandemic
The airport's services during the pandemic was sharply reduced. On 30 March 2020, the airport announced it would temporary close Terminals 1 and 3, moving all remaining flights to Terminal 2. Terminal 2D was also closed during the pandemic and only Terminals 2A, 2C, 2E, 2F and 2G were opened. During the beginning of the pandemic, airlines were grouped by alliances: Star Alliance airlines operated at Terminal 2A where Air Canada and Ethiopian Airlines operated prior to the pandemic, Oneworld airlines shifted their operations to Terminal 2C and SkyTeam airlines operated at Terminals 2E and 2F. Between December 2020 and June 2021, only Terminals 2E and 2F were opened with non-Schengen flights operating at Terminal 2E and Schengen flights operated at Terminal 2F. 2B reopened on 2 June 2021 and some airlines were shifted to that concourse. Terminals 2A, 2C and 2D were then reopened for more space. Between June 2021 and December 2022, Star Alliance airlines operated at Terminals 2A (non-Schengen) and 2B (Schengen), Oneworld airlines operated at Terminals 2C (non-Schengen) and 2D (Schengen) and SkyTeam airlines operated at Terminals 2E (non-Schengen), 2F and 2G (both Schengen). However, Star Alliance airlines flights to Asia except Singapore Airlines, who operated at Terminal 2A were operating at Terminal 2E due to the capacity restrictions at Terminal 2A.  Terminal 3 reopened on 3 May 2022 for the use of all charter and low cost airlines. Terminal 1 remained closed for renovation at that time. It reopened on 1 December 2022 to reduce traffic at Terminal 2.

Roissypôle 
Roissypôle is a complex consisting of office buildings, shopping areas, hotels, and a bus coach and RER B station within Charles de Gaulle Airport. The complex includes the head office of Air France, Continental Square, the Hilton Paris Charles de Gaulle Airport, and le Dôme building. Le Dôme includes the head office of Air France Consulting, an Air France subsidiary. Continental Square has the head office of Air France subsidiary Servair and the Air France Vaccinations Centre.

Airlines and destinations

Passenger

Cargo

Ground transportation

CDGVAL 

The airport's terminals are served by a free automated shuttle rail system, consisting of two lines (CDGVAL and LISA).

CDGVAL (Charles de Gaulle Véhicule Automatique Léger, English: Charles de Gaulle light automatic vehicle) links Terminal 1, parking lot PR, Aéroport Charles de Gaulle 1 RER station (located inside Roissypôle and next to Terminal 3), Parking lot PX, and the Aéroport Charles de Gaulle 2 TGV and RER station located between Terminals 2C, 2D, 2E, and 2F

LISA (Liaison Interne Satellite Aérogare, English: Connection internal satellite terminal) links Terminal 2E to the Satellite S3 (L Gates) and Satellite S4 (M Gates).

RER 
Charles de Gaulle Airport is connected to central Paris by the RER B, a hybrid suburban commuter and rapid transit line. The service has two stations on the airport grounds:

Aéroport Charles de Gaulle 1 station, located inside Roissypôle and next to Terminal 3. The station provides the fastest access to Terminal 1 via a connection on CDGVAL.
 Aéroport Charles de Gaulle 2 TGV station, located between Terminals 2C, 2D, 2E, and 2F.

During most times, there are two types of services that operate on the RER B between Charles de Gaulle airport and Paris:
 4 trains per hour making all stops between Charles de Gaulle airport and Saint-Rémy-lès-Chevreuse
4 trains per hour that offer non-stop express service between Charles de Gaulle airport and Gare du Nord and then all stops to Massy–Palaiseau
The express RER B service only stops at the Terminal 1 (also for Terminal 3) and Terminal 2 stations before Gare du Nord. Journey time is 30–35 minutes. The all-stops RER B service takes about 35–40 minutes and is sometimes overtaken by the express RER B trains.

The RER B has historically suffered from slowness and overcrowding, so French authorities are building CDG Express, a train service that will operate non-stop from Charles de Gaulle Airport to Paris Gare de l'Est railway station (next to Gare du Nord) starting in 2025.

TGV 
Terminal 2 includes a TGV station on the LGV Interconnexion Est line. TGV inOui, Ouigo and Thalys high-speed services operate from the station offering services to stations across France and into Belgium and The Netherlands.

Bus 
 Roissybus offers non-stop express service between Opéra station of the Paris Métro and Charles de Gaulle airport, making stops at all terminals (except 2G).
"Magical Shuttle" offers non-stop express service between Disneyland Paris and Charles de Gaulle airport, making stops at Terminal 1 and Terminal 2E/2F.
RATP bus 350 offers local (all-stops) service between Gare de l'Est/Gare du Nord in Paris and Charles de Gaulle airport, all terminals (except 2G) and other areas of the airport.
RATP bus 351 offers local service between Nation station in Paris, the Eurolines station at Gallieni station, all terminals (except 2G) and other areas of the airport.
Noctilien routes N140 and N143 offers local service during the overnight hours between Gare de l'Est/Gare du Nord in Paris and Charles de Gaulle airport, all terminals (except 2G) and other areas of the airport.

Long-distance bus 
BlaBlaBus, Eurolines, and Flixbus all offer services to international and domestic destinations from the bus station outside of the Aéroport Charles de Gaulle 1 RER station.

Car 
Charles de Gaulle Airport is directly connected to Autoroute A1 which connects Paris and Lille.

Alternative airports 
The two other airports serving Paris are Orly Airport (south of Paris, the other major airport in Paris) and Paris-Le Bourget Airport (north-northeast of Paris, for general aviation and private jets).

Beauvais airport has no railway connections, but there is a shuttle bus to central Paris 15 times daily.

Accidents and incidents 
 On 6 January 1993, Lufthansa Flight 5634 from Bremen to Paris, which was carried out under the Lufthansa CityLine brand using a Contact Air Dash 8–300 (registered D-BEAT), hit the ground  short of the runway of Charles de Gaulle Airport, resulting in the death of four out of the 23 passengers on board. The four crew members survived. The accident occurred after the pilot had to abort the final approach to the airport because the runway had been closed: the aircraft immediately ahead, a Korean Air Boeing 747, had suffered a blown tire upon landing.
 On 25 July 2000, a Concorde, Air France Flight 4590 from Charles de Gaulle to John F. Kennedy International Airport in New York, crashed into Les Relais Bleus Hotel in Gonesse, killing everyone on the aircraft and four people on the ground. Investigations concluded that a tire burst during take-off roll, after running over a metal strip on the runway that had detached from a McDonnell Douglas DC-10-30 operating as Continental Airlines Flight 55, which departed shortly before, leading to a ruptured fuel tank and resulting in engine failure and other damage. Concorde was conducting a charter flight for a German tour company.
 On 25 May 2001, a freight-carrying Short SH36 (operated as Streamline flight 200), departing to Luton, England, collided on the runway with departing Air Liberté flight 8807, an MD-83 jet. The first officer of the SH36 was killed when the wing tip of the MD-83 tore through his side of the flight deck. The captain was slightly injured and all others aboard survived.

Statistics 

The following table shows total passenger numbers.

See also 
 CDG Express
 Groupe ADP
 Paris Aéroport
 Transportation in France
 List of airports in France
 List of the busiest airports in France

Notes

References

External links

 
 
 Official website 
 Aéroports de Paris 
 
 Paris-Charles de Gaulle Airport aviation weather 

 
1974 establishments in France
Airports established in 1974
Airports in Île-de-France
Air France–KLM
Airport Roissy De Gaulle
Buildings and structures in Seine-et-Marne
Buildings and structures in Seine-Saint-Denis
Buildings and structures in Val-d'Oise
Airport